Chaplain (Major General) David Harlan Hicks (born 1942) is a retired American army officer who served as the 21st Chief of Chaplains of the United States Army from 2003 to 2007.
Hicks began his career in 1958 and was stationed as a patrolman in the Korean Demilitarized Zone in 1965. An ordained Presbyterian, he served as a command chaplain at the United States Army Special Forces Command (USASOC) at Fort Bragg, North Carolina. He has over 30 years of experience as an army chaplain.  As the Army's Chief of Chaplains, he oversaw over 2,200 chaplains serving in United States Army, National Guard, and Army Reserve capacities.

He retired in 2007, and was succeeded by Brig. Gen. Douglas L. Carver.

Awards and decorations
 Distinguished Service Medal
 Legion of Merit (with two bronze oak leaf clusters)
 Meritorious Service Medal (with one silver oak leaf cluster)
 Army Superior Unit Award
 Army Good Conduct Medal (2 awards)
 National Defense Service Medal (with two bronze service stars)
 Armed Forces Service Medal
 Humanitarian Service Medal
 NCO Professional Development Ribbon (with bronze award numeral 2)
 Army Service Ribbon
 Overseas Service Ribbon (with award numeral 5)

Gallery

References

External links
 

1942 births
Living people
American Presbyterians
United States Army generals
Recipients of the Distinguished Service Medal (US Army)
Recipients of the Legion of Merit
Place of birth missing (living people)
Chiefs of Chaplains of the United States Army
Deputy Chiefs of Chaplains of the United States Army
Recipients of the Humanitarian Service Medal